Tioga is a city in Williams County, North Dakota, United States. The population was 2,202 at the 2020 census.

Tioga was founded in 1902 and named by settlers from Tioga, New York. The population of the city increased dramatically in the 1950s following the discovery of oil nearby in the Williston Basin.

Geography

Tioga is located at  (48.396414, −102.937634).

Demographics

2010 census
As of the census of 2010, there were 1,230 people, 542 households, and 323 families living in the city. The racial makeup of the city was 96.9% White, 0.1% African American, 0.5% Native American, 0.6% Asian, 0.1% Pacific Islander, 0.2% from other races, and 1.7% from two or more races. Hispanic or Latino of any race were 0.7% of the population.

There were 542 households, of which 24.7% had children under the age of 18 living with them, 48.2% were married couples living together, 6.1% had a female householder with no husband present, 5.4% had a male householder with no wife present, and 40.4% were non-families. 34.5% of all households were made up of individuals, and 16.8% had someone living alone who was 65 years of age or older. The average household size was 2.16 and the average family size was 2.72.

The median age in the city was 47.4 years. 18.5% of residents were under the age of 18; 7.1% were between the ages of 18 and 24; 21.5% were from 25 to 44; 27.6% were from 45 to 64; and 25.4% were 65 years of age or older. The gender makeup of the city was 50.8% male and 49.2% female.

2000 census
As of the census of 2000, there were 1,125 people, 490 households, and 311 families living in the city. The population density was 856.1 people per square mile (331.6/km). There were 569 housing units at an average density of 433.0 per square mile (167.7/km). The racial makeup of the city was 97.42% White, 0.18% black, 0.89% Indigenous American, 0.18% from other races, and 1.33% from two or more races. Hispanic or Latino of any race were 0.09% of the population.

There were 490 households, out of which 25.5% had children under the age of 18 living with them, 54.5% were married couples living together, 6.3% had a female householder with no husband present, and 36.5% were non-families. 34.9% of all households were made up of individuals, and 23.7% had someone living alone who was 65 years of age or older. The average household size was 2.22 and the average family size was 2.86.

In the city, the population was spread out, with 22.5% under the age of 18, 4.2% from 18 to 24, 23.4% from 25 to 44, 23.5% from 45 to 64, and 26.5% who were 65 years of age or older. The median age was 45 years. For every 100 females, there were 86.0 males. For every 100 females age 18 and over, there were 84.7 males.

The median income for a household in the city was $29,740, and the median income for a family was $36,635. Males had a median income of $31,500 versus $21,181 for females. The per capita income for the city was $16,910. About 3.5% of families and 7.0% of the population were below the poverty line, including 6.0% of those under age 18 and 11.5% of those age 65 or over.

Education
It is within the Tioga School District.
 Central Elementary School
 Tioga High School

Media

Print
 Tioga Tribune, weekly newspaper

Radio
AM
 1090 kHz KTGO Talk

References

External links

 Tioga Tribune website

Cities in Williams County, North Dakota
Cities in North Dakota
Populated places established in 1902
1902 establishments in North Dakota